Green Wheels is a project of the Northcoast Environmental Center (NEC) in Arcata, California.  Green Wheels is a sustainable transportation advocacy group that promotes the benefits of alternatives to the single-occupancy vehicle and encourages and pressures governments, businesses, individuals and institutions to make choices that reduce transportation impacts and create balanced and sustainable transportation.

Green Wheels began as a student club of Humboldt State University in 2003 when it was called the Alternative Transportation Club.  In 2005, the club's name was changed to Green Wheels.  Green Wheels joined the NEC in July 2007.  A chapter remains as a campus club at HSU.

See also 
 Automobile dependency

External links
NEC Green Wheels
Green Wheels joins with the NEC from the Eureka Reporter, 16 July 2007

Environmental organizations based in California
Sustainable transport
Transportation in Humboldt County, California
2005 establishments in the United States
California State Polytechnic University, Humboldt
Organizations established in 2005